Rokeby School is an 11–16 secondary school for boys located in Canning Town, Greater London, England.

In 2010 the school relocated to new building on the Barking Road. Facilities at the school include technology and ICT rooms, a six court indoor sports hall, creative arts areas, a performance theatre, an all-weather multi-use games pitch and a fitness trail.

Previously a foundation school administered by Newham London Borough Council, in December 2021 Rokeby School converted to academy status. It is now sponsored by the Newham Community Schools Trust.

Rokeby School offers GCSEs and BTECs as programmes of study for pupils.

Notable former pupils 
 Calvin Bassey, footballer
 Alexander McQueen, fashion designer
 Ricky Norwood, actor
 Bradley Thomas, footballer

References

External links 
 

Boys' schools in London
Academies in the London Borough of Newham
Secondary schools in the London Borough of Newham